Anjali Rao is an Indian actress who has appeared in Tamil, Telugu and Malayalam language films, ad films, Shortfilms and television serials. After making her debut as a supporting actress, she has been seen in lead roles in films including Vanmam (2014) and Baby (2015).

Career
Anjali Rao was born in Guntur, Andhra Pradesh, India. As her father was an army Officer she travelled across the northern part of India and studied in army schools during her childhood. Her father was later transferred to Chennai and she consequently finished her schooling in Kendriya Vidyala Meenambakkam and followed that up with a BBA and MBA at Vels University in Chennai. During her time in college, Anjali Rao became involved in modelling and worked on commercials which gave her an entry into the film industry. Anjali Rao began her career playing supporting roles in films, notably appearing in the Nithya Menen-starrer Malini 22 Palayamkottai (2014), as Vijay Sethupathi's pair in the village drama Vanmam (2014) and as a ghost in the horror film Baby (2015). She later worked with Gautham Vasudev Menon in Achcham Yenbadhu Madamaiyada (2016), featuring as Silambarasan's sister.

Anjali then worked on Priyadarshan's social drama Sometimes (2017) amongst an ensemble cast, and was picked after impressing producer A. L. Vijay during their work together in commercials. She also featured in the low budget experimental films Kanna Pinna by Thiya and Peechankai.

Filmography

Television and webseries

References

Indian film actresses
Telugu actresses
Living people
Actresses in Tamil cinema
People from Bathinda district
Actresses in Telugu cinema
Actresses from Punjab, India
People from Guntur district
Actresses from Andhra Pradesh
21st-century Indian actresses
Tamil television actresses
Actresses in Tamil television
Year of birth missing (living people)
Actresses in Malayalam television
Actresses in Telugu television
Actresses in Malayalam cinema